is a former Japanese football player and manager.

Playing career
Horii was born in Fujieda on 16 March 1953. After graduating from high school, he played for Yanmar Diesel from 1971 to 1987. He played 204 games and scored 46 goals.

Coaching career
After retirement, Horii became a coach at Yanmar Diesel (later Cerezo Osaka) until 1995. In 1996, he moved to Gamba Osaka and coached until 2000. In 2001, he became a manager for Kawasaki Frontale.

Managerial statistics

References

External links

 Kawasaki Frontale
 Nagahama Football & Athletic Club member profile

1953 births
Living people
Association football people from Shizuoka Prefecture
Japanese footballers
Japan Soccer League players
Cerezo Osaka players
Japanese football managers
J2 League managers
Kawasaki Frontale managers
Association football forwards
People from Fujieda, Shizuoka